Thomas Randolph (June 1683 – 1729), also known as Thomas Randolph of Tuckahoe, was the first European settler at Tuckahoe, a member of the House of Burgesses, and the second child of William Randolph and Mary Isham, daughter of Henry Isham and Katherine Isham (Banks).

Early life
Randolph was born in June 1683 on the Turkey Island Plantation along the James River in Henrico County, Virginia. He was the son of the English immigrant William Randolph who established Turkey Island along the James River, and Mary Isham, the daughter of Henry Isham. They descend from Ishams of Northamptonshire in England. Children born to the Randolphs were William, Thomas, Isham, Richard, Henry of Longfield, Edward, Mary, John, and Elizabeth. Randolph studied at the College of William & Mary.

William Randolph acquired a lot of land that he probably used as outlying quarter plantations during his lifetime. He died in 1711 and left property to each son, along with enslaved people to work the land.

Career

Planter
William Byrd hired Randolph to oversee his Westover around March 6, 1712. Thomas inherited land from his father and purchased additional adjoining acreage on September 4, 1714, from his brother John for £90 sterling, the total of which became the Tuckahoe plantation. He owned 3,256 acres of land on which Randolph likely built a modest wood-frame house so that he could focus his energy on establishing and operating the plantation. The first church in the area Dover Church was built in 1720 by Thomas, who covered the cost with 54,990 pounds of tobacco. Until 1728, the area was mostly wilderness with just a few homesteads. Rev. William Douglass, the first permanent resident minister for the church, was not established in Northam of St. James Parish until 1750. Randolph's estate was in the part of Henrico County that later became Goochland County.

Politician
He was the Henrico county's justice in 1713. Randolph and his brother William Randolph II were the two representatives from Henrico in the House of Burgesses for the 1720 to 1722 session. Goochland was set apart from Henrico County in 1727. A year later, he was the county lieutenant for Goochland.

Personal life
Thomas Randolph of Henrico County married Judith Fleming on October 16, 1712. Judith, born about 1689, was the daughter of Susanna Tarleton and Charles Fleming of New Kent County and the sister of John and Tarleton Fleming.

The Randolphs had three children:
 William Randolph III (born 1712 or 1713) married Maria Judith, the daughter of Mann Page, and had four children, including their only son Thomas Mann Randolph Sr.
Judith Randolph (born ~1724) married her first cousin William Stith, President of the College of William and Mary, and had three children. Stith was the son of her Captain John Stith and Mary Randolph, her aunt.
Mary Randolph (born ~1726) married James Keith, a descendant of the Earls Marischal of Scotland, and had eight children. Their daughter Mary Isham Keith was the mother of John Marshall, a United States Secretary of State and Chief Justice of the United States.

Thomas died in 1729 or 1730. Judith married Nicolas Davies, an immigrant from Wales, on December 24, 1733.

Randolph was a great-uncle of United States President Thomas Jefferson...

Ancestry

See also
First Families of Virginia
Randolph family of Virginia

Notes

References

1683 births
1729 deaths
American slave owners
House of Burgesses members
People from Henrico County, Virginia
Thomasa
18th-century American politicians
People from Goochland County, Virginia